The 1981 Pacific Coast Athletic Association men's basketball tournament (now known as the Big West Conference men's basketball tournament) was held March 5–7 at the Anaheim Convention Center in Anaheim, California.

Top-seeded Fresno State topped defending champions  in the title game, 52–48, to win the Bulldogs' first PCAA/Big West men's basketball tournament. 

The Bulldogs, in turn, received a bid to the 1981 NCAA tournament, their first-ever appearance.

Format
The format remained the same as 1979, with seven teams in the field. PCAA member UC Santa Barbara did not participate.

Withseven teams participating, the top-seeded team was given a bye into the semifinals while the remaining six teams were entered into the first round and seeded based on regular season conference records.

Bracket

References

Big West Conference men's basketball tournament
Tournament
Pacific Coast Athletic Association men's basketball tournament
Pacific Coast Athletic Association men's basketball tournament